Sadhu Charan Mahato (1972/1973 – 23 November 2021) was an Indian politician and member of the Bharatiya Janata Party. Mahato was a member of the Jharkhand Legislative Assembly from the Ichagarh constituency in Seraikela Kharsawan district. He used the local Bengali language.

References 

1970s births
2021 deaths
People from Seraikela Kharsawan district
Bharatiya Janata Party politicians from Jharkhand
Members of the Jharkhand Legislative Assembly
Jharkhand MLAs 2014–2019
Year of birth missing